Tinja may refer to:

 Tinja Gornja, a village in Bosnia and Herzegovina
 Tinja, Tunisia, a town near Bizerte in northern Tunisia
 Tinja (river), a right tributary of Sava in Bosnia

See also

Tonja (name)